The Morane-Saulnier BB was a military observation aircraft produced in France during World War I for use by Britain's Royal Flying Corps. It was a conventional single-bay biplane design with seating for the pilot and observer in tandem, open cockpits. The original order called for 150 aircraft powered by 110-hp Le Rhône 9J rotary engines, but shortages meant that most of the 94 aircraft eventually built were delivered with 80 hp Le Rhône 9C rotaries  instead. A water-cooled Hispano-Suiza 8A engine was trialled as an alternative in the Type BH, but this remained experimental only. A production licence was sold to the Spanish company Compañía Española de Construcciones Aeronáuticas (CECA), which built twelve fitted with Hispano-Suiza engines in 1916.

Operational history
The type equipped a number of RFC and RNAS squadrons both in its original observation role and, equipped with a forward-firing Lewis gun mounted on the top wing, as a fighter.

Variants
MS.7 official French government STAe designation for the BB
MS.8 official French government STAe designation for the BH
BB Le Rhône 9J rotary powered variant
BH Hispano-Suiza 8A V-8 powered variant
CECA-MS or CECA-Saulnier  designations used for BB/BH built in Spain

Operators

 Royal Flying Corps
 No. 1 Squadron RFC
 No. 3 Squadron RFC
 No. 12 Squadron RFC
 No. 60 Squadron RFC
 Royal Naval Air Service
 No. 1 Squadron RNAS
 No. 3 Squadron RNAS
 No. 4 Squadron RNAS

 Spanish Air Force

 Imperial Russian Air Service

Specifications (BB)

Notes

References

Further reading

1910s French military reconnaissance aircraft
BB
Biplanes
Single-engined tractor aircraft
Aircraft first flown in 1915
Rotary-engined aircraft